Ranjit Bhargava, is an Indian environmentalist, known for his endeavors towards environmental conservation and his efforts for obtaining UNESCO World Heritage Site status for the upper Ganga region. The Government of India honored him in 2010, with the fourth highest civilian award of Padma Shri. He is also a recipient of the Order of the Golden Ark from Prince Bernard of the Netherlands and the Order of Merit of the Government of Germany.

Biography
Ranjit Bhargava was born the family of Munshi Nawal Kishore, (1836–1895) a known publisher, as a fifth generation member, in Lucknow, Uttar Pradesh, India. to Raja Ram Kumar Bhargava, holder of the title Raja by the then Viceory of India, Lord Wavell and Rani Lila Ramkumar Bhargava, a 1971 Padma Shri awardee. He headed the Uttar Pradesh chapter of the World Wide Fund for Nature (WWF). A member of the faculty of Foreign Affairs at Lucknow University, Bhargava is a Convener of the Indian National Trust For Art and Cultural Heritage (INTACH) where has instituted the INTACH Environmental Award in memory of his son, Anirudh Bhargava.

Bhargava is one of the founders of the Upper Ganga Region initiative, a collective campaign for getting the Upper Ganga Region, comprising Rishikesh and Haridwar, the status of UNESCO World Heritage Site. He is also involved with other environment related campaigns such as the Citizens' Forum on Public Policy and the campaign for the protection of Indian sites abroad, like INA Memorial in Singapore and Jim Corbett's tomb in Nyeri, Kenya.He has been honorary advisor for environment ecology and heritage to the Indian Army Central Command from 1991 to 2007.  The Hive, a British heritage bungalow used by Christopher Corbett, the father of Jim Corbett, has been bought by Bhargava and is now a tourist attraction in Ayarpatta, Nainital.

Ranjit Bhargava is the author of a book on environment by title, Environment:A Will To Fail.

Awards and recognition
Ranjit Bhargava has been honored by the Government of Germany Order of Merit. This was followed by the title, the Officer of the Order of the Golden Ark, conferred by Prince Bernhard of the Netherlands. In 2010. The Government of India included in the Republic Day honours list for the Padma Shri.

References

Further reading
 
Ranjit Bhargava has over 50 published articles on wildlife, environment and culture.
His collection of poems “Dharohar” (1995) has a foreword by Late Shri Atal Bihari Vajpayee and his book “Environment, A Will To Fail” (1999) has a foreword by Dr. M.S. Swaminathan. In 2021 his autobiography “Sarey Rah Chalte Chalte” was released.

External links
 

Year of birth missing (living people)
Living people
Recipients of the Padma Shri in other fields
Scholars from Lucknow
Recipients of the Order of Merit of the Federal Republic of Germany
Indian environmentalists
Academic staff of the University of Lucknow
Activists from Uttar Pradesh